
The Fenway Theatre (1915–1972) of Boston, Massachusetts, was a cinema and concert hall in the Back Bay, located at no.136 Massachusetts Avenue at Boylston Street. Architect Thomas W. Lamb designed the building; its interior was "marble and velvet." The auditorium sat 1,600. In the early 1970s Aerosmith used the theatre for rehearsals. In 1972 the Berklee College of Music bought the property; the remodeled Berklee Performance Center opened in 1976 and continues today.

Images

Events/Screenings

1910s
 The Misleading Lady, with Edna Mayo and Henry B. Walthall
 Behind the Screen, with Charlie Chaplin
 Unprotected, with Blanche Sweet
 At the Edge of the Aqueduct, with Doris Gray
 Man of Mystery, with E. H. Sothern
 The Great Secret, with Francis X. Bushman
 Fenway Symphony Orchestra concert

1920s
 Water Water Everywhere, with Will Rogers
 April Folly, with Marion Davies
 Ghost in the Garret, with Dorothy Gish
 The Inner Voice, with Agnes Ayres
 A Question of Honor, with Anita Stewart
 The Ruling Passion, with George Arliss
 Come on Over, with Colleen Moore
 Josephine Elbery ("the Back Bay nightingale")
 Yellow Men and Gold, with Helene Chadwick
 The Yankee Consul
 Lilac Time

1930s-1950s

1960s-1970s

 Question 7
 T Rex in concert
 Badfinger in concert
[Butterfield Blues Band Reunion December 10-11 or 21-22 1971]

References

External links

 Library of Congress. Drawing of Fenway Theatre, Massachusetts Ave. and Boylston St., Boston, Massachusetts, 1926.
 Flickr. Question 7 at the Fenway Theater, Boston, Massachusetts, 1961

Back Bay, Boston
1915 establishments in Massachusetts
Cultural history of Boston
20th century in Boston
Former theatres in Boston
Former cinemas in the United States
Music venues in Boston
Theatres completed in 1915
Event venues established in 1915
Thomas W. Lamb buildings